Joseph Richmond (26 February 1897–1953) was an English footballer who played in the Football League for Barnsley, Leeds United and Norwich City.

References

1897 births
1953 deaths
English footballers
Association football forwards
English Football League players
Sittingbourne F.C. players
Leeds United F.C. players
Barnsley F.C. players
Norwich City F.C. players